The Quebec and Ontario Transportation Company was a shipping firm in Canada prior to the opening of the St Lawrence Seaway.

her fleet included:

Relevant History
 News bulletin source: Toronto Marine Historical Society

References

Shipping companies of Canada